Floride is a 2015 French comedy-drama film directed by Philippe Le Guay and starring Jean Rochefort and  Sandrine Kiberlain. The screenplay was written by Le Guay and Jérôme Tonnerre, based on the 2012 play Le Père by Florian Zeller. The film had its premiere at the Locarno International Film Festival in August 2015.

Cast 
 Jean Rochefort as Claude Lherminier
 Sandrine Kiberlain as Carole Lherminier
 Laurent Lucas as Thomas  
 Anamaria Marinca as Ivona 
  as Robin 
 Coline Beal as Juliette 
 Edith Le Merdy as Madame Forgeat  
 Stéphanie Bataille as The director of the nursing home
 Philippe Duclos as Dr. Farkoa 
 Audrey Looten as Alice 
 David Clark as Andrew
 Patrick d'Assumçao as the Man in pavilion

Production 
The film was shot entirely on location in Annecy from 16 September to 25 October 2014.

Reception 

Reviewing for the Montreal Gazette, Brendan Kelly gives the film 3.5 of 5 stars, and writes:
There are many reasons to see French writer-director Philippe Le Guay's Floride. In a movie world dominated by stories focused on young, beautiful people, this moving drama shines the light on one rather cranky 81-year-old man. That's one plus. It’s also a flick that will resonate with those of us who’ve spent serious time grappling with the challenges of helping out our aging parents. But the real reason you have to see Floride is for the masterful lead performance from 85-year-old actor Jean Rochefort.

References

External links 
 

2015 films
2015 comedy-drama films
2010s French-language films
French comedy-drama films
French films based on plays
Gaumont Film Company films
Films directed by Philippe Le Guay
Films about old age
Films about Alzheimer's disease
2010s French films